Same Thing Different Day is the second studio album by American rapper Trae. It was released on July 6, 2004, by Trae's independently-owned record label, called G-Maab Entertainment. The album was re-packaged into four discs with the first disc being the original release of the album, but also includes tracks in the first-half from its album's original release onto the second disc and each tracks in the second-half from its album's original release onto the third disc being chopped and screwed; as well as the fourth disc being a DVD.

Track listing

Charts

References

External links

2004 albums
Trae tha Truth albums
Albums produced by Happy Perez
Albums produced by Mike Dean (record producer)